Amandine Suzanne Monique Leynaud (born 2 May 1986) is a French professional handball player. She is openly lesbian and she and her wife Annabelle are parents to Marcel and Mila.

Career
She competed at the 2008, 2012 and 2016 and won a silver medal in 2016, finishing fifth in 2008 and 2012. Domestically she was named the Best Goalkeeper in French Division 1 in 2009, 2010 and 2011.

At the 2008 Olympics, both Leynaud and teammate Valérie Nicolas were listed among the top goalkeepers in the competition. After Nicolas retired from the national team, Leynaud's status as starting goalkeeper was secured. At the 2012 Olympics, Leynaud was listed third among the top ten goalkeepers of the championship with a rate of 38%.

For the 2012–13 season, Leynaud signed for Romanian top club CS Oltchim Râmnicu Vâlcea but failed to play any official match after she suffered a ligaments injury to the right ankle in August 2012, which required surgery. The team was disbanded at the end of the season due to financial difficulties. Due to her injury Leynaud also missed the 2012 European Championships.

Since 2013 until 2018, she played for ŽRK Vardar. Together with them, she played in Final Four five-times in a row, finishing third three-times and reaching the final twice (in 2017 and in 2018).

In 2018, she joined the star-studded Hungarian team, Győr. Since 2020, she also served as the goalkeeper coach of the team until 2022, when she retired. One year after she has ended her career she returned to Győr because of Silje Solberg's pregnancy.

Achievements
EHF Champions League:
Winner: 2019
French Championship:
Winner: 2005, 2006, 2007, 2008, 2009, 2011
French Cup:
Winner: 2010
French League Cup:
Winner: 2005, 2006, 2007, 2008, 2009, 2010, 2011
Hungarian Championship
Winner: 2019, 2022
Hungarian Cup:
Winner: 2019, 2021

Individual awards
 Handball-Planet.com All-Star Goalkeeper: 2017
 MVP of the EHF Champions League Final Four: 2018
 All-Star Goalkeeper of the Møbelringen Cup: 2018
 All-Star Goalkeeper of the European Championship: 2018
 All-Star Goalkeeper of the EHF Champions League: 2020, 2021

References

External links

1986 births
Living people
People from Aubenas
French female handball players
Expatriate handball players
French expatriate sportspeople in Hungary
French expatriate sportspeople in North Macedonia
French expatriate sportspeople in Romania
Handball players at the 2008 Summer Olympics
Handball players at the 2012 Summer Olympics
Olympic handball players of France
SCM Râmnicu Vâlcea (handball) players
Győri Audi ETO KC players
Handball players at the 2016 Summer Olympics
Handball players at the 2020 Summer Olympics
Medalists at the 2016 Summer Olympics
Medalists at the 2020 Summer Olympics
Olympic gold medalists for France
Olympic silver medalists for France
Olympic medalists in handball
Sportspeople from Ardèche
European champions for France
French LGBT sportspeople
21st-century LGBT people